Mary Lou (née Miller) Cowlishaw (February 20, 1932 – June 23, 2010) was an American journalist and politician.

Born in Rockford, Illinois, Cowlishaw received her bachelor's degree in journalism from University of Illinois at Urbana–Champaign and did graduate work at Northwestern University. She then worked on the editorial board of the Naperville Sun newspaper. Cowlishaw served on the Naperville, Illinois Board of Education from 1972 to 1983 and was a Republican. Then Cowlishaw served in the Illinois House of Representatives from 1983 until 2002. She was an adjunct professor at North Central College. She also wrote a book about the history of the Naperville Municipal Band: This Band's Has Been Here Quite a Spell. Cowlishaw died in Naperville, Illinois where she had lived since 1958.

Notes

1932 births
2010 deaths
Politicians from Naperville, Illinois
Politicians from Rockford, Illinois
University of Illinois Urbana-Champaign College of Media alumni
Medill School of Journalism alumni
North Central College faculty
Journalists from Illinois
Writers from Naperville, Illinois
Women state legislators in Illinois
School board members in Illinois
Republican Party members of the Illinois House of Representatives
American women academics
21st-century American women